The Men's 50 metre freestyle event at the 2015 African Games took place on 11 September 2015 at Kintele Aquatic Complex.

Schedule
All times are Congo Standard Time (UTC+01:00)

Records
Prior to the competition, the existing world and championship records were as follows.

Results

Heats 
The heats were held on 11 September.

Final 
The final were held on 11 September.

References

External links
Official website

Swimming at the 2015 African Games